Cláudia Silvia Chabalgoity (born 13 March 1971) is a former professional tennis player from Brazil.

Biography
Born in Brasilia, Chabalgoity began playing tennis at the age of three. She has an elder brother, Carlos, who also played briefly on the pro tour.

Right-handed Chabalgoity began touring internationally in 1989 and won two ITF $25k titles that year, one at home in São Paulo and the other in the Spanish city of Pamplona. She had a best singles ranking of 121, attained in 1990. As a doubles player, she made it to 102 in the world and was runner-up in two WTA Tour tournaments. She appeared in the main draw of two Grand Slam events, the women's doubles at the 1990 US Open, then both the women's doubles and mixed doubles at the 1991 French Open.

During her career, she represented Brazil in several international competitions. As a member of the Brazil Fed Cup team, she featured in a total of six ties, all across 1990 and 1991 (overall record: 1–7). Her only win was in singles, against Bulgaria's Elena Pampoulova. At the 1991 Pan American Games in Havana, she was a gold medalist in the team competition, and also won silver medals in both the women's doubles and mixed doubles events. She competed for Brazil in the women's doubles tournament at the 1992 Summer Olympics, where she and partner Andrea Vieira won their first-round match against Sweden's Catarina Lindqvist and Maria Lindström, before being beaten by the bronze medal-winning Australian team in the second round.

She now runs a tennis school in Brasilia for people with disabilities.

WTA career finals

Doubles: 2 (2 runner-ups)

ITF finals

Singles: 10 (4–6)

Doubles: 7 (4–3)

References

External links
 
 
 

1971 births
Living people
Brazilian female tennis players
Sportspeople from Brasília
Tennis players at the 1991 Pan American Games
Pan American Games gold medalists for Brazil
Pan American Games silver medalists for Brazil
Pan American Games medalists in tennis
Olympic tennis players of Brazil
Tennis players at the 1992 Summer Olympics
Medalists at the 1991 Pan American Games
21st-century Brazilian women
20th-century Brazilian women